Gene Eric Lang (born March 15, 1962) is a former professional American football running back in the National Football League (NFL). He played seven seasons for the Denver Broncos and the Atlanta Falcons. He attended Louisiana State University, where he played college football for the LSU Tigers football team and earned All SEC honors as a freshman. He had 20 total touchdowns in his professional career: 11 rushing and nine receiving. He is perhaps best known for his role in the 1986 AFC Championship Game as his poor recovery of a kickoff set up what is known in NFL lore as “The Drive”. Lang lives in Denver, Colorado, and owns a mortgage lending business.

References

External links
NFL.com player page
Stats

1962 births
Living people
People from Pass Christian, Mississippi
American football running backs
LSU Tigers football players
Denver Broncos players
Atlanta Falcons players